Soong Mei-ling  (also spelled Soong May-ling, ; March 5, 1898 – October 23, 2003), also known as Madame Chiang Kai-shek or Madame Chiang, was a Chinese political figure who was First Lady of the Republic of China, the wife of President Chiang Kai-shek of the Republic of China. Soong played a prominent role in the politics of the Republic of China and was the sister-in-law of Sun Yat-sen, the founder and the leader of the Republic of China. She was active in the civic life of her country and held many honorary and active positions, including chairwoman of Fu Jen Catholic University. During World War 2, she rallied against the Japanese; and in 1943 conducted an eight-month speaking tour of the United States to gain support.

Early life
She was born in her family home, a traditional house called Neishidi (內史第), in Pudong, Shanghai, China. She was born on March 5, 1898, though some biographies give the year as 1897, since Chinese tradition considers one to be a year old at birth.

She was the fourth of six children of Charlie Soong, a wealthy businessman and former Methodist missionary from Hainan, and his wife Ni Kwei-tseng. Mei-ling's siblings were sister Ai-ling, sister Ching-ling, who later became Madame Sun Yat-sen, older brother Tse-ven, usually known as T. V. Soong, and younger brothers Tse-liang (T.L.) and Tse-an (T.A.)

Education

In Shanghai, May-ling attended the McTyeire School for Girls with her sister, Ching-ling. Their father, who had studied in the United States, arranged to have them continue their education in the US in 1907. May-ling and Ching-ling attended a private school in Summit, New Jersey. In 1908, Ching-ling was accepted by her sister Ai-ling's alma mater, Wesleyan College, at age 15 and both sisters moved to Macon, Georgia, to join Ai-ling. May-ling insisted she have her way and be allowed to accompany her older sister though she was only ten, which she did. May-ling spent the year in Demorest, Georgia, with Ai-ling's Wesleyan friend, Blanche Moss, who enrolled May-ling as an 8th grader at Piedmont College. In 1909, Wesleyan's newly appointed president, William Newman Ainsworth, gave her permission to stay at Wesleyan and assigned her tutors. She briefly attended Fairmount College in Monteagle, Tennessee in 1910.

May-ling was officially registered as a freshman at Wesleyan in 1912 at the age of 15. She then transferred to Wellesley College two years later to be closer to her older brother, T. V., who, at the time, was studying at Harvard. By then, both her sisters had graduated and returned to Shanghai. She graduated from Wellesley as one of the 33 "Durant Scholars" on June 19, 1917, with a major in English literature and minor in philosophy. She was also a member of Tau Zeta Epsilon, Wellesley's Arts and Music Society. As a result of being educated in English all her life, she spoke excellent English, with a southern accent which helped her connect with American audiences.

Madame Chiang

Soong Mei-ling met Chiang Kai-shek in 1920. Since he was eleven years her elder, already married, and a Buddhist, Mei-ling's mother vehemently opposed the marriage between the two, but finally agreed after Chiang showed proof of his divorce and promised to convert to Christianity. Chiang told his future mother-in-law that he could not convert immediately, because religion needed to be gradually absorbed, not swallowed like a pill. They married in Shanghai on December 1, 1927. While biographers regard the marriage with varying appraisals of partnership, love, politics and competition, it lasted 48 years. The couple had no children. They renewed their wedding vows on May 24, 1944, at St. Bartholomew's Church in New York City. Polly Smith sang the Lord's Prayer at the ceremony.

Madame Chiang initiated the New Life Movement and became actively engaged in Chinese politics. In 1928, she was made a member of the Committee of Yuans by Chiang. She was a member of the Legislative Yuan from 1930 to 1932 and Secretary-General of the Chinese Aeronautical Affairs Commission from 1936 to 1938. In 1937 she led appeals to women to support the Second Sino-Japanese War, which led to the establishment of women's battalions, such as the Guangxi Women's Battalion.

In 1945 she became a member of the Central Executive Committee of the Kuomintang. As her husband rose to become Generalissimo and leader of the Kuomintang, Madame Chiang acted as his English translator, secretary and advisor. During World War II, Madame Chiang tried to promote the Chinese cause and build a legacy for her husband. Well-versed in both Chinese and Western culture, she became popular both in China and abroad.

In 1934, Soong Mei-ling was given a villa in Kuling town, Lu Mountain. She and her husband Chiang Kai-shek both loved the villa very much. Chiang Kai-shek named the villa Mei Lu Villa to symbolize the beauty of Lu Mountain. The couple usually stayed at this villa in Kuling town, Lu Mountain in summertime, so the mountain is called Summer Capital, and the villa is called the Summer Palace.

"Warphans"

Although Soong Mei-ling initially avoided the public eye after marrying Chiang, she soon began an ambitious social welfare project to establish schools for the orphans of Chinese soldiers. The orphanages were well-appointed: with playgrounds, hotels, swimming pools, a gymnasium, model classrooms, and dormitories. Soong Mei-ling was deeply involved in the project and even picked all of the teachers herself. There were two schools - one for boys and one for girls—built on a  site at the foot of Purple Mountain, in Nanjing. She referred to these children as her "warphans" and made them a personal cause. The fate of the children of fallen soldiers became a much more important issue in China after the beginning of the war with Japan in 1937. In order to better provide for these children she established the Chinese Women's National War Relief Society.

Visits to the U.S.

Soong Mei-ling made several tours to the United States to lobby support for the Nationalists' war effort. She drew crowds as large as 30,000 people and in 1943 made the cover of TIME magazine for a third time. She had earlier appeared on the October 26, 1931, cover alongside her husband and on the January 3, 1937, cover with her husband as "Man and Wife of the Year."

Arguably showing the impact of her visits, in 1943, the United States Women's Army Corps recruited a unit of Chinese-American women to serve with the Army Air Forces as "Air WACs", referred to as the "Madame Chiang Kai-Shek Air WAC unit".

Both Soong Mei-ling and her husband were on good terms with Time magazine senior editor and co-founder Henry Luce, who frequently tried to rally money and support from the American public for the Republic of China. On February 18, 1943, she became the first Chinese national and the second woman to address both houses of the US Congress. After the defeat of her husband's government in the Chinese Civil War in 1949, Madame Chiang followed her husband to Taiwan, while her sister Soong Ching-ling stayed in mainland China, siding with the communists. Madame Chiang continued to play a prominent international role. She was a Patron of the International Red Cross Committee, honorary chair of the British United Aid to China Fund, and First Honorary Member of the Bill of Rights Commemorative Society.

Later life

After the death of her husband in 1975, Madame Chiang assumed a low profile. She was first diagnosed with breast cancer in 1975 and would undergo two mastectomies in Taiwan. She also had an ovarian tumor removed in 1991.

Chang Hsien-yi claimed that Soong Mei-ling and military officials loyal to her expedited the development of nuclear weapons and even set up a parallel chain of command to further their agenda.

Chiang Kai-shek was succeeded to power by his eldest son Chiang Ching-kuo, from a previous marriage, with whom Madame Chiang had rocky relations. In 1975, she emigrated from Taiwan to her family's 36 acre (14.6 hectare) estate in Lattingtown, New York, where she kept a portrait of her late husband in full military regalia in her living room. She kept a residence in Wolfeboro, New Hampshire, where she vacationed in the summer. Madame Chiang returned to Taiwan upon Chiang Ching-kuo's death in 1988, to shore up support among her old allies. However, Chiang Ching-kuo's successor, Lee Teng-hui, proved more adept at politics than she was, and consolidated his position. She again returned to the U.S. and made a rare public appearance in 1995 when she attended a reception held on Capitol Hill in her honor in connection with celebrations of the 50th anniversary of the end of World War II. Madame Chiang made her last visit to Taiwan in 1995. In the 2000 Presidential Election on Taiwan, the Kuomintang produced a letter from her in which she purportedly supported the KMT candidate Lien Chan over independent candidate James Soong (no relation). James Soong never disputed the authenticity of the letter. Soong sold her Long Island estate in 2000 and spent the rest of her life in a Gracie Square apartment on the Upper East Side of Manhattan owned by her niece. An open house viewing of the estate drew many Taiwanese expatriates. When Madame Chiang was 103 years old, she had an exhibition of her Chinese paintings in New York.

Death
Madame Chiang died in her sleep in New York City, in her Manhattan apartment on October 23, 2003, at the age of 105. Her remains were interred at Ferncliff Cemetery in Hartsdale, New York, pending an eventual burial with her late husband who was entombed in Cihu, Taiwan. The stated intention is to have them both buried in mainland China once political differences are resolved.

Upon her death, The White House released a statement:

Jia Qinglin, chairman of the National Committee of the Chinese People's Political Consultative Conference (CPPCC), sent a telegram to Soong's relatives where he expressed deep condolences on her death.

Appraisals by international press

The New York Times obituary wrote:

Life magazine called Madame the "most powerful woman in the world."
Liberty magazine described her as "the real brains and boss of the Chinese government."
Clare Boothe Luce compared her to Joan of Arc and Florence Nightingale.
Ernest Hemingway called her the "empress" of China.

Awards and honors
:
 Grand Cross of Order of the Sun of Peru (1961)

:
 Order of Merit for National Foundation, 1st class (1966)

In popular culture 
Her tour to San Francisco is mentioned (under the name Madame Chiang) in Last Night at the Telegraph Club, a 2021 novel by Malinda Lo.

Gallery

Internet videos
 
 Soong Mei-ling and the China Air Force
 1995: US senators held a reception for Soong Mei-ling in recognition of China's role as a US ally in World War II.

See also

 Second Sino-Japanese War
 Xi'an Incident
 History of the Republic of China
 Military of the Republic of China
 President of the Republic of China
 Politics of the Republic of China
 Soong sisters
 Soong Ai-ling
 Soong Ching-ling
 Claire Lee Chennault
 Flying Tigers
 Chiang Fang-liang
 National Revolutionary Army
 Sino-German cooperation (1911–1941)
 Address to Congress - The full text of her 1943 address
 The Last Empress: Madame Chiang Kai-shek and the Birth of Modern China - A 2009 biography of Soong Mei-ling

References

Bibliography
 
  Preview at Google Books
  Preview at Google Books
  Preview at Internet Archive
 
  Preview at Internet Archive
  Preview at Google Books

External links

Audio of her speaking at the Hollywood Bowl, 1943 (3 hours into program)
 As delivered text transcript, complete audio, video excerpt of her address to the US Congress, 1943
 
 Time magazine's "Man and Wife of the Year," 1937
 Madame Chiang being honored by U.S. Senate Majority Leader Robert Dole (left) and Senator Paul Simon (center) at the U.S. Capitol in Washington, DC, July 26, 1995
 Madame Chiang Kai-shek, 1898–2003
 Life in pictures: Madame Chiang Kai-shek
 Voice of America obituary
 Madame Chiang, 105, Chinese Leader's Widow, Dies - The New York Times
 The extraordinary secret of Madame Chiang Kai-shek
 Madame Chiang Kai-shek - The Economist
 What a 71-Year-Old Article by Madame Chiang Kai-Shek Tells Us About China Today - The Atlantic
 Madame Soong Mei-ling's Life in Her Old Age
 

 
 

1898 births
2003 deaths
Republic of China politicians from Shanghai
Burials at Ferncliff Cemetery
Chinese anti-communists
Chinese centenarians
Chinese Methodists
Chinese people of World War II
Chiang Kai-shek family
Kuomintang politicians in Taiwan
Women in China
Sun Yat-sen family
First ladies of the Republic of China
Wellesley College alumni
Women leaders of China
Articles containing video clips
Female army generals
Chinese Civil War refugees
Taiwanese people from Shanghai
Taiwanese centenarians
Time Person of the Year
Women centenarians
American anti-communists
Grand Crosses of the Order of the Sun of Peru
Recipients of the Order of Merit for National Foundation
New York (state) Republicans